Sergio Palleroni is an American architect, professor, and fellow at the new Institute for Sustainable Solutions at Portland State University in Portland, Oregon. He is known for his social and environmental activism, providing with his students and collaborators sustainable design solutions to communities in need. Since 2013 he has been director of the Center for Public Interest Design, the first such design research center in the US, whose mission is, in the words of its mission statement, "To investigate and promote design practices that are a catalyst for the social, economic and environmental change needed to serve the growing needs of communities both locally and worldwide."

Education
Palleroni was educated at the University of Oregon where he received his B.Arch., and at the Massachusetts Institute of Technology where he received an M.S. in History, Theory, and Criticism.

Work
After graduation, Palleroni worked for a decade in Nicaragua, Mexico and Northern Africa on UN and World Bank sponsored projects before returning to teaching at the University of Washington.

From 1986 he began a series of longterm collaborations with Carlos Mijares, and then most importantly Gabriela Videla, that led to architecture design projects that would fundamentally influence his career in what is now termed "public interest design". With Videla in 1987 they founded ADE (Accion y Dessarollo Ecologico) an NGO which growing out of the social mission and practices of Paolo Freire and Ivan Illych, with whom they collaborated through their outreach organization CED. ADE would from 1987 begin implement public works in the poor informal, formal settlements of Central Mexico, which would establish a new model of practice in the region. The NGO was reconstituted as Comunidad AC in 1997 to allow it to fundraise for social interest projects in the region, many which have since been constructed over the last three decades through collaborations with international students of architecture and design. These collaborations began in 1988 through University of Oregon fieldwork studios, and where formalized as an organization in their own right in 1995, as the BASIC Initiative (basicinitiative.com) while Sergio Palleroni was an associate professor in the University of Washington College of Built Environments (formerly the College of Architecture and Urban Planning).  The outreach organization was founded in collaboration with Professor David Riley now at Penn State.

Today BASIC Initiative (www.basicinitiative.org and www.basicinitiative.com) is a service learning program which every year challenges students at various partner universities in the US, Latin America and Europe, and Asia to engage the problems of communities traditionally underserved by the design fields. Based on the pedagogical ideas of service learning and reflective practice, students have to date taken on the design of construction of more than 95 distinct projects in regions ranging from Southern India, Central Africa, Mexico and SE Asia to Native American communities in the US and Latin America. Among the multiple on-going public interest design programs that have emerged from this organization have been: The Design/Build Mexico Program; The American Indian Housing Initiative (AIHI in collaboration with Red Feather Development); Yaqui Single Mothers Housing Initiative (Hogar del Viento); The Ladakh Initiative (in collaboration with ARUP and the Druk White Lotus School); Katrina Furniture Project (KFP); and housing initiatives with teenage homelessness (Outside In, Portland, Oregon), Katrina Refugees (Houston with the Harpo Foundation, Mississippi with the Gulf Coast Community Design Center), and Latin America informal settlements with the governments of Argentina, Colombia, Haiti, Mexico and Uruguay). Currently active are projects in Buenos Aires, Haiti, Chile (through the Start-Up Chile initiative); SE Asia, Ladakh and the US.

Awards
While at the University of Washington, Palleroni received increasing international recognition including the AIA/ACSA National Education Award and NCARB National Education Award, and in 2008 the 1st National Education Award given by the US Green Building Council (USGBC).  He has also received awards from various countries (Mexico, Nicaragua, Colombia, India, China, and Taiwan among the most recent).  In 2005 Palleroni received the   US National Design Awards' Special Jury Commendation, and in 2006 he was inducted into the Interior Design Hall of Fame, and been the recipient of numerous national and international appointments and fellowships, including the Smithsonian's First Artist Fellowships in Residence (2007–2008), and Humana Fellowship in 2009. In 2011 the David Perkes, Roberta Feldman and Bryan Bell were awarded the Latrobe Prize by the Fellows of the American Institute of Architects, the highest academic prize given by the profession in the US.

Publications
Recent writings on his work include, among other publications, Studio at Large: Architecture in Service of Global Communities (University of Washington Press, 2004), "Design Like You Give a Damn" (Metropolis Books. 2006), "Building One House" (Princeton Architecture Press, 2005), and "Expanding Architecture: Design as Activism" (Metropolis Books, 2008), "Beyond Shelter: An Architecture of Human Dignity," Metropolis Books, 2011), and in the PBS series on global sustainability "Design e2" (2006), which devoted one episode, "Green for All", to his work with the world's poor.

Recent work
In 2004 Palleroni was invited by Professor Steven Moore and the Center for Sustainable Practices at the University of Texas to establish a fieldwork program to support a university-wide initiative to engage students in sustainability through community engagement. His work at UT, supported by a Luce Foundation grant, led in the next four years to the creation of the Alley Flat Initiative (http://thealleyflatinitiative.org), an infill housing program that addresses issues of sustainability and social equity in Austin communities to the date.

In Fall 2008 Palleroni accepted a position as a professor and senior fellow of the Institute for Sustainable Solutions at Portland State University. Thanks to a significant donation in 2012, a new Center for Public Interest Design (CPID) was founded in March 2013, promoting public interest design and the education of both students and professionals in this emerging field. In 2014 the first graduate degree in Public Interest Design was approved by the Faculty Senate of Portland State University, with the first graduates of the program completing the coursework in fall 2015. The requirements of the degree include coursework, research and fieldwork with the latter often in ongoing project sites worldwide of the Center for Public Interest Design and the BASIC Initiative. Currently (Fall 2015) the center counts on a staff of five full-time faculty members, 21 graduate students and fourteen international interns working principally on eleven national and international research and project initiatives.

Gallery

References
 Palleroni, Sergio, Studio at Large: Architecture in Service of Global Communities, University of Washington Press, Seattle and London 2004
SantaMaria, R. and S. Palleroni, "La Obra de Carlos Mijares:  Tiempo y otra Construcciones" (Escala, Bogota, Seville, 1989, 1991, 2000). 202 pp
Experiments in Design Pedagogy",  Mao-lin Chiu, editor (Taipei, 2007)
Cameron Sinclair and Kate Stohr, "Design Like You Give a Damn", (Metropolis Books, 2006)
"Expanding Architecture: Design as Activism", Bryan Bell and Katie Wakeford, editors (Metropolis Books, 2008)
"Beyond Shelter: Architecture and Human Dignity", Marie Aquilino, editor (Metropolis Books/Thames and Hudson, 2011)

External links

centerforpublicinterestdesign.org
thealleyflatinitiative.org
basicinitiative.org
basicinitiative.com
www.pdx.edu/public-interest-design
Palleroni Leite Design Partnership (PLDP) – the official website of Palleroni's architectural firm

Living people
University of Oregon alumni
Massachusetts Institute of Technology alumni
University of Washington faculty
University of Texas at Austin faculty
Portland State University faculty
Year of birth missing (living people)
21st-century American architects
National Design Award winners